August Sommer House is a historic home located at Indianapolis, Indiana.  It was built in 1880, and is a two-story, three bay, Italianate style brick dwelling with rear addition.  It sits on an ashlar limestone foundation and has segmental arched windows and a low hipped roof.  It features a full-with front porch with cut-work detail.  It has been converted to commercial uses.

It was listed on the National Register of Historic Places in 1980.

References

Houses on the National Register of Historic Places in Indiana
Italianate architecture in Indiana
Houses completed in 1880
Houses in Indianapolis
National Register of Historic Places in Indianapolis